Ruby Wright (January 8, 1914 – March 9, 2004) was an American singer and songwriter.

Biography
Born in Anderson, Indiana, United States, she began singing with a trio of college girls in Lake Manitou, Indiana.

Though not very successful in the United States, she had two hits in the United Kingdom. The first, "Bimbo", made number 7 in the UK Singles Chart in April 1954, whilst in May 1959, her cover version of "Three Stars" reached number 19. Her most popular recording was a Christmas single, written by Ruth Lyons, "Let's Light the Christmas Tree" which sold 250,000 copies in 1958. She also sang on the radio on WLW, and appeared on Lyons show, "50-50 Club", for twenty years.

Wright was married to bandleader, Barney Rapp. She also sang in his orchestra. The couple had four daughters.

A CD of Wright's recordings, which contained a total of 27 songs, is entitled Ruby Wright Regular Girl (The King Recordings 1949–1959).

References

External links

 

1914 births
2004 deaths
American women singer-songwriters
King Records artists
Writers from Anderson, Indiana
Musicians from Anderson, Indiana
20th-century American singers
20th-century American women singers
21st-century American women
Singer-songwriters from Indiana